Flavours from Fjällbacka is a cookbook by author Camilla Läckberg and chef Christian Hellberg, who both grew up in Fjällbacka, a municipality in Sweden that provides the theme of the book.

Niklas Bernstone provided the photography for the book, including "action shots" of the pair cooking on location around Fjällbacka.

References

External links
https://web.archive.org/web/20141128073204/http://www.camillalackberg.com/cookery-books/flavours-from-fjallbacka/

Swedish cookbooks
2008 non-fiction books
Västra Götaland County